Portable application creators allow the creation of portable applications (also called portable apps). They usually use application virtualization.

Creators of independent portable
No agent or client is required for these (also called "agentless" solutions):
BoxedApp - Packer Developer Tool
Cameyo - Application Virtualization (Free for personal use)
Ceedo
Enigma - Virtual Box - Application Virtualization System for Windows
JauntePe - Free Portable App creator
Evalaze - Application Virtualization
InstallFree Bridge (Doesn't appear available since acquisition by Watchdox in Dec 2012)
LANDesk Application Virtualization
PortableApps.com
Moxly.io
Turbo Studio (formerly: Spoon Studio and Xenocode Virtual Application Studio)
VMware ThinApp (formerly: Thinstall)

Related software
AIX 6.1 Live Application Mobility
Citrix XenApp
Java Web Start
AppImage (Linux)
Microsoft App-V
MojoPac
Sandboxie
Symantec Endpoint Virtualization Suite
Systancia AppliDis
Windows To Go
Zero Install (Linux)

See also 
 Application directory
 Application streaming
 Application virtualization
 Comparison of application virtual machines
 Desktop virtualization
 Emulator
 Shim (computing)
 Software as a service
 Startkey
 U3
 Virtual application
 Workspace virtualization
 Low code

References

Portable software
Virtualization software